Kamarudin bin Jaffar (Jawi: قمرالدين بن جعفر; born 3 November 1951) is a Malaysian politician who served as the Deputy Minister of Foreign Affairs for the second term in the Barisan Nasional (BN) administration under former Prime Minister Ismail Sabri Yaakob and former Minister Saifuddin Abdullah from August 2021 to the collapse of the BN administration in November 2022 and the first term in the Perikatan Nasional (PN) administration under former Prime Minister Muhyiddin Yassin and former Minister Hishammudin Hussein from March 2020 to the collapse of the PN administration in August 2021, Member of Parliament (MP) for Bandar Tun Razak from May 2018 to November 2022, Deputy Minister of Transport in the Pakatan Harapan (PH) administration under former Prime Minister Mahathir Mohamad and former Minister Anthony Loke Siew Fook from July 2018 to the collapse of the PH administration in February 2020 and MP for Tumpat from November 1999 to May 2018. He is a member of the Malaysian United Indigenous Party (BERSATU), a component party of the PN coalition and was a member of the People's Justice Party (PKR), a component party of the PH opposition coalition, Malaysian Islamic Party (PAS), a former component party of the former opposition Pakatan Rakyat (PR) and Barisan Alternatif (BA) coalitions and United Malays National Organisation (UMNO), a component party of the Barisan Nasional (BN) coalition. 

Earlier Kamarudin was a member of United Malays National Organisation (UMNO), a major component in Barisan Nasional (BN) coalition before switching to PAS in 1999. While a member of UMNO, he was considered a close associate of then Deputy Prime Minister and later Opposition Leader Anwar Ibrahim, and was held in custody with Anwar under the Internal Security Act (ISA).

Kamarudin made his debut contesting but lost the Tumpat parliamentary constituency in 1995 general election when he was still in UMNO. Since switching to PAS, Kamarudin was elected to the Tumpat seat in the 1999, 2004, 2008 and 2013 elections. For the 2004 election, he was the PAS Secretary-General. He subsequently contested and won the Bandar Tun Razak constituency in the 2018 elections after joining PKR.

Kamarudin was sworn in as Deputy Minister of Transport from 2 July 2018 until 24 February 2020, which is part of Prime Minister Mahathir's 7th Cabinet.

Biodata
Kamarudin bin Jaffar was born on 3 November 1951 at Wakaf Bharu, Tumpat, Kelantan. Attended SRK Sultan Ibrahim, Pasir Mas, Kelantan (1958-1963). At the Malay College Kuala Kangsar (1964-1970) he studied with Datuk Seri Anwar Ibrahim. He furthered his studies at University of Kent, Canterbury, England (1971-1974) later at the University of London (1975-1976).

Family
His wife Kamariah Kamarudin died on 11 November 2009 for colon cancer after receiving treatment at the Subang Jaya Medical Center (SJMC) including chemotherapy. At that time, Kamaruddin Jaafar was in Qatar. The body was prayed at Nurul Yaqin Mosque, SS7 Kelana Jaya and was buried at Bukit Kiara after Asar prayers.

They have four children, two sons and two daughters:
 Nur Adilah
 Saiful Adli
 Shahid Adli
 Nur Shifa

Kamaruddin Jaafar married for the second time with Datin Yushazlinda Yaacob on 10 March 2011. The wedding ceremony was held at Tengku Kelana Jaya Mosque Petra, Kelana Jaya, Selangor. His wife is from Melaka. Also present were Mahfuz Omar, Dr Dzulkefly Ahmad and Dr Mohd Hatta Ramli.

Career
 Assistant Secretary, Research Division, Prime Minister's Department (1974-1975)
 Lecturer, National University of Malaysia (1975-1985)
 Political Secretary to Deputy Prime Minister, Tun Ghafar Baba (1986-1991)

Politics
 Malaysian UMNO Youth Exco
 Kelantan UMNO Youth chief
 Tumpat Umno Division chief 1998
 Secretary of the Angkatan Belia Islam Malaysia (ABIM) Session 1983-1987
 PAS Secretary General Session 2005-2007 and 2007-2009 session
 Member of the Central Committee of PAS Session 2003-2005
 PAS Liaison Committee 2003-2005
 Tumpat PAS District Treasurer (2003 until 2015)

Joining UMNO
Kamaruddin Jaafar is seated with Datuk Seri Anwar Ibrahim when advancing the Angkatan Belia Islam Malaysia and Yayasan Anda Akademik in the Valley of the Coast near the University of Malaya.

While Anwar Ibrahim joined UMNO and became the Minister and Deputy Prime Minister of Malaysia, he was among the main leaders of ABIM who put their trust in UMNO with the intention of giving UMNO a deeper perspective. It was here that he was appointed chairman of the Institute of Policy Studies, a think tank founded by Datuk Seri Anwar Ibrahim. Other ABIM leaders joining UMNO were Kamaruddin, Anuar Tahir and Mohd Nor Monutty and many others surrounded Anwar Ibrahim. Anwar Ibrahim, surrounded by the people of ABIM, is disliked by the ranks of UMNO leaders such as Sanusi Junid. In 1995 he contested in Tumpat on BN/UMNO tickets but lost to a PAS candidate.

ISA Detention
On 22 September 1998, he and 12 other leaders were detained under the Internal Security Act (ISA) Section 73(1)(A). The detainee was
 Anwar Ibrahim, Deputy Prime Minister of Malaysia
 Ruslan Kassim, Negeri Sembilan Umno Youth chief
 Kamaruddin Mat Noor, Semarak state assemblyman
 Ahmad Zahid Hamidi, UMNO Youth chief and Bagan Datoh MP
 Ahmad Azam Abdul Rahman, President of ABIM
 Mukhtar Redhuan, ABIM's Vice President
 Shaharuddin Badaruddin, ABIM's Secretary-General
 Abdul Halim Ismail, ABIM's Vice President
 Kamarudin Jaffar, Chairman of the Institute for Policy Studies
 Tamunif Mokhtar, Cheras UMNO Division Chief
 Abdul Manan, President of the Islamic Student Association of Malaysia
 Prof. Dr. Sidek Baba, UIAM

Dismissed from UMNO and joined PAS
On 6 July 1999, the UMNO Supreme Council fired nine party members, including Tumpat Umno division chief Datuk Kamaruddin Jaafar, for involvement in assisting and joining opposition parties following the dismissal of his ABIM partner, Anwar Ibrahim. Deputy Prime Minister of Malaysia Abdullah Ahmad Badawi sent a show cause letter to them. Also dismissed were Ismail Yusof, Haji Said Othman, Tarmizi Ismail and Jumri Sabran from Umno Bukit Gantang. Abdullah Badawi (UMNO Johor Bahru), Senator Hamzah Mohd Zain (Chenderoh) and Saufi Daud and Mohamad Noor (UMNO Tumpat).

On 21 July 1999, he declared to join PAS Tumpat during a talk by PAS President and PAS Spiritual Leader Dato' Nik Abdul Aziz Nik Mat. To him, there is no room in UMNO to implement the political way of Islam.

Joining PKR
On 11 September 2015, Kamaruddin with Tan Sri Muhammad Muhammad Taib has left PAS and joined PKR. During the internal upheavals of PAS in 2015, he was seen closely with PAS split-off group Gerakan Harapan Baru (GHB), which later formed the National Trust Party (AMANAH). Both figures say that their participation in PKR is aimed at strengthening the new coalition of the opposition and at the same time staying with AMANAH.

Election results

Honours
  :
  Knight Companion of the Order of Loyalty to Negeri Sembilan (DSNS) – Dato' (1994)

References

Living people
1951 births
People from Kelantan
Members of the Dewan Rakyat
Former Malaysian Islamic Party politicians
Malaysian United Indigenous Party politicians
Former United Malays National Organisation politicians
Former People's Justice Party (Malaysia) politicians
Malaysian people of Malay descent
Malaysian Muslims